La macchinazione (The Plot) is a 2016 Italian biographical drama film directed by David Grieco, starring Massimo Ranieri and based on the last hours of Pier Paolo Pasolini's life before his murder.

Ranieri, who portrays Pasolini, met the poet when he was young and Pasolini himself was very surprised by the physical similarity between the two of them.

Plot
In the summer of 1975, the writer and film director Pier Paolo Pasolini is completing his latest film Salò, or the 120 Days of Sodom, and has started writing a political essay, Petrolio (Oil). Meanwhile, he begins a dalliance with the young Giuseppe 'Pino' Pelosi, a rent boy with a criminal record. According to the film, the youngster and his accomplices steal some reels of Pasolini's latest film, which they offer to return in exchange for a large ransom. This is a trap, which leads to the director's brutal murder on 2 November 1975.

Cast
 Massimo Ranieri as Pier Paolo Pasolini
 Milena Vukotic as Susanna Colussi, Pasolini's mother
 Libero De Rienzo as Antonio Pinna
 Roberto Citran as Giorgio Steimetz
 Alessandro Sardelli as Giuseppe Pelosi
 Paolo Bonacelli as the Bishop

Awards and nominations
Nastro d'Argento Awards (2016)
 Nomination for Nastro d'Argento for Best Supporting Actress to Milena Vukotic
 Nomination for Nastro d'Argento for Best Cinematography to Fabio Zamarion

References

External links

2016 films
2016 biographical drama films
Italian biographical drama films
2010s Italian-language films
2016 drama films
Pier Paolo Pasolini